Karaftit is a rural locality (a settlement) in Bauntovsky District, Republic of Buryatia, Russia. The population was 4 as of 2010. There is 1 street.

Geography 
Karaftit is located 1,085 km west of Bagdarin (the district's administrative centre) by road.

References 

Rural localities in Bauntovsky District